The men's K-1 500 metres event was an individual kayaking event conducted as part of the Canoeing at the 1992 Summer Olympics program that took place at Castelldefels.

Medalists

Results

Heats
28 competitors first raced in four heats. The top two finishers from each of the heats advanced directly to the semifinals with the rest competing in the repechages.

Repechages
The top three finishers from each of the three repechages along with the fourth fastest advanced to the semifinals.

Semifinals
The top four finishers in each of the two semifinals along with the fifth fastest advanced to the final.

Final
The final was held on August 7.

Kolehmainen was only seventh at the halfway mark before coming from behind to beat defending Olympic champion Gyulay.

References
1992 Summer Olympics official report Volume 5. pp. 134–5. 
Sports-reference.com 1992 men's K-1 500 m results
Wallechinsky, David and Jaime Loucky (2008). "Canoeing: Men's Kayak Singles 500 Meters". In The Complete Book of the Olympics: 2008 Edition. London: Aurum Press Limited. p. 470.

Men's K-1 500
Men's events at the 1992 Summer Olympics